Lusakunk is a village in the Vardenis Municipality of the Gegharkunik Province of Armenia.

Etymology 
The village was previously known as Tuskyulu.

Gallery

References

External links 

World Gazeteer: Armenia – World-Gazetteer.com

Populated places in Gegharkunik Province